Benning Wentworth (July 24, 1696 – October 14, 1770) was an American merchant and colonial administrator who served as the governor of New Hampshire from 1741 to 1766. While serving as governor, Wentworth is best known for issuing several land grants in territory claimed by the Province of New Hampshire west of the Connecticut River, which led to disputes with the neighboring colony of New York and the eventual founding of Vermont.

Born in Portsmouth, New Hampshire into a prominent colonial family in 1692, Wentworth was groomed by his father John while growing up to assume control over the family business before misbehavior while studying at Harvard College led him to be sent to Boston instead in 1715. There, Wentworth was apprenticed at his uncle's business before becoming a merchant. In 1730, he returned to Portsmouth to assume control over his father's estate.

After Wentworth returned to his family, he soon started becoming involved in politics, sitting on both the House of Representatives and the governor's council in the 1730's. There, he allied with Theodore Atkinson against political rivals Jonathan Belcher and Richard Waldron. In 1733, Spain refused to pay Wentworth for a timber shipment, leaving him in debt. Negotiations in London to resolve this led to Wentworth being appointed governor in 1741. 

Wentworth used his position as governor to entrench his family's economic and political dominance in New Hampshire. In the 1760's, a dispute with the colonial government in neighboring New York ultimately led to an end to Wentworth's land grants, and he eventually stepped down as governor in 1766. Wentworth soon retired to his mansion in Portsmouth, where he died four years later. The town of Bennington, Vermont was named in his honor.

Early life

Benning Wentworth was born on July 24, 1696, in Portsmouth, New Hampshire. His father, John Wentworth, was a ship's captain, businessman and colonial administrator who served as the lieutenant-governor of colonial New Hampshire from 1717 until 1730 after spending two years serving on merchant ships. Wentworth's mother, Sarah Hunking Wentworth, was the daughter of Captain Mark Hunking, a wealthy resident of Portsmouth.

Growing up, Wentworth was initially groomed by his father to take over the family business, though this changed after he graduated from Harvard College in 1715. Due to poor behavior Wentworth exhibited while studying at Harvard, including setting a college record in windows broken and fines paid, his father instead arranged for him to undergo an apprenticeship at his uncle Samuel Wentworth's counting house in Boston, Massachusetts.

After the apprenticeship, his father arranged for Wentworth to work as a merchant, plying the colonial trade with the West Indies and Spain in timber, wine and brandy for about a decade. After his father died in December 1730, Wentworth, who had not acquired any property in Boston, returned to Portsmouth to assume control over his inheritance, including 2,000 pounds, extensive real estate, and the family trade in ship masts and timber.

Political career

In the same year, Wentworth also took his place as the head of a powerful and politically connected New Hampshire family who were opponents of colonial administrator Jonathan Belcher and his political ally Richard Waldron. Prior to this occurring, Belcher and Waldron had ousted his family from positions of political authority, which led Wentworth to conspire with fellow politician Theodore Atkinson to remove the two from power. 

In August 1732, Wentworth was elected to the New Hampshire House of Representatives. He subsequently used the influence of political ally David Dunbar, then serving as the lieutenant-governor of the colony, to become appointed to the governor's council in 1734. While he was sitting on the House of Representatives and the governor's council, Wentworth worked with several allies to undermine Belcher and Waldron's political influence, as the pair sought to unite New Hampshire with Massachusetts (Wentworth wanted the two colonies to be completely separate politically).

After British settlers established the Province of Georgia in 1732, Anglo-Spanish relations quickly deteriorated, and in 1733 the Spanish government refused to pay Wentworth for a shipment of timber worth 11,000 pounds. This refusal put Wentworth at the mercy of his creditors in Boston, and he was forced to borrow heavily from British merchants in London, in particular associate John Thomlinson, to pay them off. Wentworth lodged a claim against the British government, claiming that they needed to repay him for the Spanish state's refusal to pay for the timber shipment.

In 1738, Wentworth travelled to London to negotiate a deal with his British contacts, including both merchants and government officials, as he was on the verge of bankruptcy. While he was in London, a commission was established to determine the boundary lines between the provinces of New Hampshire and Massachusetts Bay, which were then disputed by both colonies. Under the influence of Atkinson, who sat on the commission, its members eventually decided to issue a ruling in support of New Hampshire's boundary claims, doubling the size of the nascent colony.

Meanwhile, Wentworth continued to negotiate with his contacts in London. Eventually, Thomlinson (who held political influence due to Thomas Pelham-Holles, 1st Duke of Newcastle being his patron) formulated a plan where in exchange for 300 pound sterling, Wentworth would be appointed as the governor of New Hampshire; in return, he would drop his ongoing claim against the British government. Wentworth's supporters in New Hampshire quickly raised the sum for him, and on December 12, 1741, Wentworth officially succeeded Belcher as the governor.

Governorship and death

During his tenure as governor, Wentworth proved himself to be a "shrewd, compromising, and accommodating politician". Wentworth primarily concerned himself in office with issuing land grants, placating potential rivals by issuing them with justice of the peace and military commissions, and appeasing the timber industry by turning a blind eye to the controversial white pine laws, allowing merchants free access to the New Hampshire forests in order to cut down white pine trees so long as they kept supplying masts to his brother Mark, who sold them to the British Royal Navy.

In the mid-1730's, most of Wentworth's family members converted to Anglicanism, joining the Church of England. Wentworth joined them in the early-1740's and supported the Society for the Propagation of the Gospel, a missionary arm of the Church, by issuing them several land grants on the North American frontier. During this period, Wentworth ensured his dominance in the New Hampshire political scene by filling government positions with his relatives to ensure they dominated the profitable mast trade, a stranglehold which lasted until the American Revolutionary War.

From 1748 to 1752, Wentworth sparked a constitutional crisis by extending representation to newly-established colonial settlements which he knew politically supported him. Wentworth also vetoed the house's decision to nominate Waldron as speaker of the house, taking these steps because his political opponents had by now gained a majority in the house. The house objected, which led to a political impasse as both sides refused to concede. Wentworth eventually received instructions from Crown officials supporting his position, which led to the standoff being resolved in his favor.

Beginning in 1749, Wentworth issued a a series of land grants to expand the borders of New Hampshire. These included 131 towns, many of which were in territory contested with New York, which disputed Wentworth's grants and appealed to the Board of Trade and Plantations. The board eventually issued a ruling on July 26, 1764 in favor of New York. As a result, all settlers in the region had to live under New York's jurisdiction, which many of them resented; eventually, a group of settlers from New Hampshire declared independence in 1777 as the State of Vermont.

The controversy surrounding the land grants and Thomlinson's failing health led Wentworth to quietly step down as governor on July 30, 1766. His nephew John, who had prevented Wentworth from being dismissed in disgrace due to his political relationship with Charles Watson-Wentworth, 2nd Marquess of Rockingham, assumed the governorship of New Hampshire the next year in 1767. Wentworth then retired to his personal mansion at Little Harbor, Portmouth, where he died on October 14, 1770. After his death, Wentworth was buried in the cemetery of Queen's Chapel.

Personal life, family and legacy

During his political career, Wentworth gained a "reputation of being haughty and arrogant yet shrewd and tenacious", and was pejoratively nicknamed "Don Granada" and "Don Diego" by his political opponents. He was described by American historian David E. Van Deventer as being "able to [both] maintain a family dynasty and Portsmouth's control of the prosperous mast trade for a generation" who was "perhaps even British America's first political machine."

Wentworth was the eldest child in a family which consisted of eight brothers and five sisters, all of them sharing the same parents. Many of his family followed Wentworth into political careers, while others married his associates; Wentworth's sister Hannah married Theodore Atkinson. On December 13, 1719, Wentworth married Abigail Ruck, the daughter of a wealthy Boston merchant. The couple had three sons, all of whom died before Wentworth.

After Abigail died in 1755, Wentworth remarried on March 15, 1760, to his 23-year old housekeeper, Martha Hilton. He had several children with Martha, though all of them were stillborn. Angered that his family had shunned him over marrying someone who was socially beneath him, Wentworth gave his estate in its entirety to Martha in his last will and testament, leaving them nothing. Martha remarried after his death to Michael, a relative of Wentworth.

Wentworth parlayed his mercantile and political career to acquire a small fortune, which included 10,000 guineas and several real estate properties. His involvement in issuing land grants led to several settlements to be directly and indirectly named after him; the town of Bennington, Vermont was named in his honor. After a famous Revolutionary War battle occurred near Bennington in 1771, the town of Bennington, New Hampshire was named after it.

References

Notes

Footnotes

Bibliography

 
 
 
 
 
 
 
 
 
 
 
 
 
 
 
 

1696 births
1770 deaths
18th-century American landowners
18th-century British North American people
Burials in New Hampshire
Colonial American merchants
Colonial governors of New Hampshire
Harvard College alumni
Merchants from the Thirteen Colonies
Politicians from Portsmouth, New Hampshire